Steve Little may refer to:

 Steve Little (American football) (1956–1999), American football kicker and punter
 Stephen Little (born 1954), Asian art scholar
 Steve Little (boxer) (1965–2000), American boxer
 Steve Little (actor) (born 1972), American comic actor
 Steve Little (rugby league) (born 1953), Australian rugby league player

See also
 Steven Van Zandt (born 1950), aka Little Steven